Lawrence McAllister Urquhart (born 24 September 1935) is a Scottish businessman and formerly the chairman of Burmah Castrol, Scottish Widows, British airports operator BAA Limited, and a director of Lloyds TSB, Imerys and Kleinwort Benson.

Early life 
A native Scot, he was educated at Strathallan School and King's College London (LLB). He is qualified as a solicitor and chartered accountant.

Career 
Urquhart was chairman of Burmah Castrol from March 1980 to September 1991; he was also its managing director in 1985. He's worked for Dresdner Kleinwort Benson and was an executive boss of Burmah until 1993. He was also a director of Imerys, Kleinwort Benson, and Lloyds TSB. In 1997, Urquhart became deputy chairman of BAA Limited. He served in that capacity until 2002. He was a director of the Scottish Widows from 3 March 2000 to 12 March 2002.

Personal life 
He is married to Elizabeth (born 1937) and has four children. He was an avid golfer.

References

1935 births
Living people
People educated at Strathallan School
Alumni of King's College London
Burmah-Castrol
Scottish businesspeople
Scottish solicitors
Scottish accountants
British solicitors
British accountants
Scottish chairpersons of corporations